The Ambassador of Australia to Vietnam is an officer of the Australian Department of Foreign Affairs and Trade and the head of the Embassy of the Commonwealth of Australia to the Socialist Republic of Vietnam. The position has the rank and status of an Ambassador Extraordinary and Plenipotentiary and has resided exclusively in Hanoi since 1975. The current ambassador, since September 2022, is Andrew Goledzinowski.

The ambassador's work has been assisted since 1994 by a Consulate-General in Ho Chi Minh City.

Posting history
In 1949, the three constituent states of French Indochina, the State of Vietnam and the protectorates of Cambodia and Laos were granted the status of an associated state within the French Union, with gradual limited independence from 1950 including in foreign affairs. On 12 January 1952, the Australian Minister for External Affairs, Richard Casey, announced the establishment of diplomatic relations between Australia and the Associated States of Vietnam, Laos, and Cambodia, and that a legation would be established in Saigon. The legation opened on 23 March 1952, with John Rowland as charge d'affaires, and the first minister, John Quinn, took office from November 1952. Quin presented his credentials to the Chief of State of Vietnam, Bảo Đại, on 29 December 1952, to the King of Cambodia, Norodom Sihanouk, on 7 February 1953, and to the King of Laos, Sisavang Vong, on 2 April 1953.

On 20 January 1955, External Affairs Minister Casey announced that a separate Australian Legation to Cambodia would shortly be established in Phnom Penh, with the minister resident in Saigon continuing to be accredited to Cambodia. The Cambodia office opened on 29 October 1955 with Harold David Anderson as charge d'affaires, and the Saigon-resident ministers would continue to represent Cambodia until 1957, when a separate minister was appointed. A separate legation office for Laos was established in Vientiane on 12 October 1959, and on 30 December 1960 Arthur Morris was appointed as the first separate minister to Laos. On 21 August 1959, with the appointment of the first ambassador to Vietnam, Bill Forsyth, the Saigon legation was raised to the status of embassy. The Australian Embassy to the Republic of Vietnam, based from 1962 to 1975 in the Caravelle Hotel, was evacuated in the days before the Fall of Saigon.

On 26 February 1973, Australia established diplomatic relations with the Democratic Republic of Vietnam (North Vietnam) and opened its Embassy in Hanoi on 28 July 1973. David Wilson was appointed the first Ambassador on 7 November 1973. On 22 August 1975, with the collapse of the government of the Republic of Vietnam on 30 April 1975, Australia established diplomatic relations with the Provisional Revolutionary Government of the Republic of South Vietnam, with ambassador Wilson in Hanoi holding non-resident accreditation to the provisional government from 8 August 1975. On 22 January 1976 Wilson presented his credentials in Saigon. On 2 July 1976, it was announced that North and South Vietnam had merged to form the Socialist Republic of Vietnam, with Hanoi as the capital, and the Australian Embassy continued its representation there. A Consulate-General opened in Ho Chi Minh City in November 1994 as part of an Australian Government expansion of trade-focused diplomatic posts.

Heads of mission

Ministers to Vietnam

Ambassadors to the Republic of Vietnam (South Vietnam)

Ambassador to the Democratic Republic of Vietnam (North Vietnam)

Ambassadors to the Socialist Republic of Vietnam

Consuls-General in Ho Chi Minh City

See also
Australia–Vietnam relations

References

External links

Australian Embassy, Vietnam
Australian Consulate-General – Ho Chi Minh City, Vietnam

 
Vietnam
Australia
Vietnam
Australia